Euonyma laeocochlis is a species of an air-breathing land snail, terrestrial pulmonate gastropod mollusk in the family Achatinidae.

E. laeocochlis is the type species of the genus Euonyma.

This species has not been collected since its original description in 1896. Herbert (2006) rediscovered this species in South Africa in 2006.

Distribution 
This species is endemic to South Africa. The type locality is "Humansdorp, St. Francis Bay", South Africa.

Description 
E. laeocochlis has been described by British malacologists James Cosmo Melvill (1845-1929) and by John Henry Ponsonby-Fane (1848-1916) in 1896. Its type description read as follow:

References 
This article incorporates public domain text from the reference 

Endemic fauna of South Africa
laeocochlis
Gastropods described in 1896